The 2009 RSA T20 Cup was a Women's Twenty20 (T20) cricket tournament that was held in Ireland in May 2009. The tournament was originally planned as a tri-nation series between Ireland, Pakistan and South Africa, but Nottinghamshire replaced South Africa before the tournament began. It was part of Pakistan's tour of Ireland and England before the 2009 ICC Women's World Twenty20.

Pakistan won the tournament with four wins from their four matches, whilst Ireland and Nottinghamshire won one game apiece.

Squads

Points table

Source: CricketArchive

Fixtures

See also
 Pakistani women's cricket team in England and Ireland in 2009

References

External links
RSA T20 Cup 2009 from Cricinfo

Pakistan women's national cricket team tours
Women's international cricket tours of Ireland
International cricket competitions in 2009
2009 in women's cricket